Tanistry is a Gaelic system for passing on titles and lands.  In this system the Tanist is the office of heir-apparent, or second-in-command, among the (royal) Gaelic patrilineal dynasties of Ireland, Scotland and Mann, to succeed to the chieftainship or to the kingship.

The word is preserved in the Republic of Ireland's government, where the prime minister is the Taoiseach while the deputy prime minister is the Tánaiste.

Origins
Historically the tanist was chosen from among the heads of the roydammna or "righdamhna" (literally, those of kingly material) or, alternatively, among all males of the sept, and elected by them in full assembly. The eligibility was based on patrilineal relationship, which meant the electing body and the eligibles were agnates with each other. The composition and the governance of the clan were built upon male-line descent from a similar ancestor. The office was noted from the beginning of recorded history in Ireland, and probably pre-dates it. A story about Cormac mac Airt refers to his eldest son as his tanist. Following his murder by a member of the Deisi, another roydammna, Eochaid Gonnat, succeeded as king.

In Ireland, the tanistry continued among the dominant dynasties, as well as lesser lords and chieftains, until the mid-16th/early 17th century when it was replaced by English common law. When in 1943 Ireland appointed its first new Chief Herald, it did not reintroduce tanistry. The state granted courtesy recognition to Irish chiefs based on primogeniture from the last known chief.

The royal succession in Celtic Scotland was limited to the elective agnatic or male line of the Siol Alpein (House of Alpin) until the accession of King Malcolm II in 1005. This monarch was the first to introduce the concept of hereditary monarchy in Scotland. He did so to try to eliminate the strife caused by the elective law, which encouraged rival claimants to fight for the throne. Since Malcolm had only daughters, he also introduced the right of female-line succession in Scotland. This gave rise to conflict by competitors for generations thereafter. The Irish monarchies, for their part, never at any stage allowed for female line succession.

Candidates and functions
The king or chief held office for life and was required by custom to be of full age, in possession of all his faculties, and without any remarkable blemish of mind or body. At the same time, and subject to the same conditions, a tanist or next heir to the Monarchy was elected, who if the king died or became disqualified, at once became king. Typically a former king's son became tanist (sometimes the son of the king simultaneously elected, however perhaps more often a son of a rival branch of the dynasty), but not because the system of primogeniture was in any way recognised; indeed, the only principle adopted was that the dignity of chieftainship should descend to the eldest and most worthy agnate of the last ruler. (Note this still disqualified many in the clan, since most clansmen were clients, not related to the ruling line, patrilineally or otherwise.)

One of the most common rules for qualification as a roydammna was that a candidate had to be a member of the previous chief's "derbfhine", a kindred including all descended in the male line from a common great-grandfather. However it was often restricted to the chief's gelfhine, a fine descended from one common (patrilineal) grandfather. This meant that the group became highly exclusive, keeping the kingship within the dynasty. Many in the wider clan might be reduced to gentry or peasant status (though they might share the surname). These features make tanistry an agnatic succession mode, and a succession by appointment, as it was an elective monarchy. Tanistry evades the basic requirement of the hereditary monarchy, i.e. that the outcome of the succession is predictable, up to the identity of successor and next heirs, by genealogy.

The downside of the large group of eligibles was that increases in roydammna in each generation might lead to internecine dynastic civil war. Such was the case among the descendants of King and High King Tairrdelbach Ua Conchobair (1088–1156). His dynasty, the Uí Briúin, had successfully ruled as Kings of Connacht since at least the mid-5th century. Their increasing consolidation via the annexation of the Kingdoms of Mide and Dublin, plus suborning neighboring states and lordships to vassalage, led to Tairrdelbach becoming the first of his dynasty to become High King.

Competition between Tairrdelbach's many sons caused corrosive warfare among at least four competing main lines, in addition to allied lordships' and kingdoms' striving for the main chance. Coupled with the incursions of the Normans from 1169 onwards, this fragmented Ó Conchobhar rule. By the mid-13th century, they were reduced to ruling a fraction of their former patrimony.

Another example of Derbfhine or Roydammna proliferation comes from the Annals of Connacht. It states that at the Second Battle of Athenry in August 1316, in addition to King Tadc Ó Cellaig of Uí Maine, "there fell with him ... twenty-eight men who were entitled to succeed to the kingship of Uí Maine."

Consequences
The tanistry system often led to rotation among the most prominent branches of the clan or the reigning house, particularly in the Middle Ages. Though not necessarily intended to be so, tanistry was perceived to create balance between branches of family. A quite usual pattern was that the chief (king, lord) was succeeded by his tanist, elected earlier and from another branch than that which the incumbent chief belonged to. Perhaps simultaneously upon that succession, a tanist was elected from another branch, to fill the position vacated by the one now risen to chieftainship. He may have come from the branch to which the deceased belonged. The next vacancy would be handled in a similar way. If a chieftain attempted to have his own son (or brother) chosen over a representative of another branch, the electors were outraged, as they feared subjugation to one branch.

In 1296, the Bruce candidate to inherit the crown of Scotland pleaded the traditional tanistry in his favor. In terms of primogeniture, he was from a cadet branch of the old royal descent, and thus would not have succeeded. The idea of rotation and balance (and his seniority in physical age and experience) made him a credible competitor. A Pictish aspect was that both the House of Balliol and Bruce descended through female lines from the royal house, and were allowed to present candidacy. Bruce also claimed tanistry through a female line. (This may be an indication that in Scotland, Pictish and Gaelic succession rules were intermingled. The judicial resolution of the succession quarrel, directed by the English king, favoured the Balliols on the basis of primogeniture. Subsequent political events reverted that result to a more "clannish-tradition" direction. Robert the Bruce, grandson of the candidate who argued for tanistry, ascended the throne despite descending from a rather junior cadet line of the original Royal House. All future monarchs of Scotland after that succeeded by the rights of the Bruce.)

Tanistry as the system of succession left the headship open to the ambitious. It was a frequent source of strife both in families and between the clans, but it was conversely quasi-democratic. Tanistry was abolished by a legal decision during the reign of James VI of Scotland, who later was named James I of England and Ireland. The English land law was substituted.

The rules of succession of the House of Alpin of Scottish monarchs (a dynasty of mixed Pictish and Gaelic origin) and their successors, abided by tanistry rules until at least 1034. They also used them in certain successions in the 1090s, and tanistry was used as an argument in succession litigation as late as the 1290s. A similar system operated in Wales, where under Welsh law any of the sons or brothers of the king could be chosen as the edling or heir to the kingdom.

Tanistry
In the broadest sense, the name 'Tanistry' describes the functional principle that "the most talented male member of the royal dynasty should inherit the throne, commonly by murder and war".

It is specifically used to describe the practical ramifications of the Turco-Mongol, as well as other Central Asian steppe nomad, principles of inheritance and succession.  Because all male members of the royal clan are considered to have equally legitimate claims on power, the ruler is the individual who eliminates competitors and re-subjugates the rest of the state formation. The structure may be determined by bonds of personal loyalty to the ruler, which are considered to be dissolved on the ruler's death.

Uses in literature and popular culture

 Sir James Frazer incorporated the concept of the tanist as a substitute for the sacred king as a central element in his analysis of European mythologies, The Golden Bough.
 The figure of the tanist has appeared in modernist poetry, such as T. S. Eliot's The Waste Land.
 Amateur mythographer Robert Graves (1955) assumed tanistry was the original form of kingship in archaic Greek society for his interpretation of The Greek Myths. He used the same idea extensively in The White Goddess to interpret the sacred marriage of the king to the pre-Greek supreme goddess.
 In the Deryni novel, the character Dhugal MacArdry is Tanist of Clan MacArdry.

See also

Agnatic seniority
Chiefdom
Chiefs of the Name
Clan
Dynasty
Elective monarchy
High King of Ireland
Kingdoms of ancient Ireland
Mandala (Southeast Asian political model)
Order of succession
Partible inheritance
Patrilineal
Primogeniture

Footnotes

References

Sources

External links
 

Constitutional law
Monarchy in medieval Ireland
Feudalism in Scotland
Inheritance
Early Gaelic law